Plittersdorfer Straße is a Bonn Stadtbahn station in Bonn-Bad Godesberg, served by lines 16, 63 and 67. The tiles of the station are colored blue.

References

External links 

Cologne-Bonn Stadtbahn stations